Dreisesselberg may refer to:
Dreisesselberg (Bavarian Forest), a mountain of Bavaria, Germany, in the Bavarian Forest
Dreisesselberg (Lattengebirge), a mountain of Bavaria, Germany